The Scottish Gliding Union is the largest gliding club in Scotland.  The body is based at the Scottish Gliding Centre on Portmoak Airfield, Scotlandwell, KY13 9JJ.

External links
Scottish Gliding Centre
Scottish Gliding Union Ltd - Young Persons Protection Policy

Sports venues in Scotland
Gliding in Scotland
Perth and Kinross
Sports organisations of Scotland